The Bolivarian Games Football tournament started on 15 November and will end on 23 November. It is organised by CONMEBOL. Nations are represented by the under-17 age group national team.

Squads

Venue

Group stage

Medal stage

Bronze medal match

Gold medal match

References 

Football
2017
2017 Bolivarian Games
Bolivarian Games
Bolivarian Games
Bolivarian Games
Bolivarian Games Football